In mathematical logic, the arithmetical hierarchy, arithmetic hierarchy or Kleene–Mostowski hierarchy (after mathematicians Stephen Cole Kleene and Andrzej Mostowski) classifies certain sets based on the complexity of formulas that define them.  Any set that receives a classification is called arithmetical.

The arithmetical hierarchy is important in computability theory, effective descriptive set theory, and the study of formal theories such as Peano arithmetic.

The Tarski–Kuratowski algorithm provides an easy way to get an upper bound on the classifications assigned to a formula and the set it defines.

The hyperarithmetical hierarchy and the analytical hierarchy extend the arithmetical hierarchy to classify additional formulas and sets.

The arithmetical hierarchy of formulas 

The arithmetical hierarchy assigns classifications to the formulas in the language of first-order arithmetic. The Greek letters here are lightface symbols, which indicates that the formulas do not contain set parameters.

Since any formula with bounded quantifiers can be replaced by a formula without quantifiers (for example,  is equivalent to ), we can also allow  to have bounded quantifiers.

A  formula is equivalent to a formula that begins with some existential quantifiers and alternates  times between series of existential and universal quantifiers; while a  formula is equivalent to a formula that begins with some universal quantifiers and alternates analogously.

Because every first-order formula has a prenex normal form, every formula is assigned at least one classification. The only relevant classification assigned to a formula is thus the one with the least n; all the other classifications can be determined from it.

The arithmetical hierarchy of sets of natural numbers 

A set X of natural numbers is defined by a formula φ in the language of Peano arithmetic (the first-order language with symbols "0" for zero, "S" for the successor function, "+" for addition, "×" for multiplication, and "=" for equality), if the elements of X are exactly the numbers that satisfy φ.  That is, for all natural numbers n,

A set is definable in first-order arithmetic if it is defined by some formula in the language of Peano arithmetic.

If X is definable by a  formula then X is assigned the classification . If X is definable by a  formula then X is assigned the classification . If X is both  and  then  is assigned the additional classification .

Note that it rarely makes sense to speak of  formulas; the first quantifier of a formula is either existential or universal.

A parallel definition is used to define the arithmetical hierarchy on finite Cartesian powers of the set of natural numbers.  Instead of formulas with one free variable, formulas with k free number variables are used to define the arithmetical hierarchy on sets of k-tuples of natural numbers. These are in fact related by the use of a pairing function.

Relativized arithmetical hierarchies 

To do so, fix a set of natural numbers Y and add a predicate for membership of Y to the language of Peano arithmetic. We then say that X is in  if it is defined by a  formula in this expanded language. In other words, X is  if it is defined by a  formula allowed to ask questions about membership of Y.  Alternatively one can view the  sets as those sets that can be built starting with sets recursive in Y and alternately taking unions and intersections of these sets up to n times.

For example, let Y be a set of natural numbers.

Arithmetic reducibility and degrees 

Arithmetical reducibility is an intermediate notion between Turing reducibility and hyperarithmetic reducibility.

A set is arithmetical (also arithmetic and arithmetically definable) if it is defined by some formula in the language of Peano arithmetic.

The relation  is reflexive and transitive, and thus the relation  defined by the rule

is an equivalence relation.  The equivalence classes of this relation are called the arithmetic degrees; they are partially ordered under .

The arithmetical hierarchy of subsets of Cantor and Baire space

Note that elements of the Cantor space can be identified with sets of natural numbers and elements of the Baire space with functions from natural numbers to natural numbers.

The ordinary axiomatization of second-order arithmetic uses a set-based language in which the set quantifiers can naturally be viewed as quantifying over Cantor space.   A subset of Cantor space is assigned the classification  if it is definable by a  formula.  The set is assigned the classification  if it is definable by a  formula.  If the set is both  and  then it is given the additional classification .  For example, let  be the set of all infinite binary strings which aren't all 0 (or equivalently the set of all non-empty sets of natural numbers).  As  we see that  is defined by a  formula and hence is a  set.

Note that while both the elements of the Cantor space (regarded as sets of natural numbers) and subsets of the Cantor space are classified in arithmetic hierarchies,  these are not the same hierarchy.  In fact the relationship between the two hierarchies is interesting and non-trivial.  For instance the  elements of the Cantor space are not (in general) the same as the elements  of the Cantor space so that  is a  subset of the Cantor space.  However, many interesting results relate the two hierarchies.

There are two ways that a subset of Baire space can be classified in the arithmetical hierarchy.
An equivalent definition of the analytical hierarchy on Baire space is given by defining the analytical hierarchy of formulas using a functional version of second-order arithmetic; then the analytical hierarchy on subsets of Cantor space can be defined from the hierarchy on Baire space.  This alternate definition gives exactly the same classifications as the first definition.

A parallel definition is used to define the arithmetical hierarchy on finite Cartesian powers of Baire space or Cantor space, using formulas with several free variables.  The arithmetical hierarchy can be defined on any effective Polish space; the definition is particularly simple for Cantor space and Baire space because they fit with the language of ordinary second-order arithmetic.

Note that we can also define the arithmetic hierarchy of subsets of the Cantor and Baire spaces relative to some set of natural numbers.

Extensions and variations

It is possible to define the arithmetical hierarchy of formulas using a language extended with a function symbol for each primitive recursive function.

A more semantic variation of the hierarchy can be defined on all finitary relations on the natural numbers; the following definition is used. Every computable relation is defined to be .
 If the relation  is  then the relation  is defined to be 
 If the relation  is  then the relation  is defined to be 
This variation slightly changes the classification of some sets. It can be extended to cover finitary relations on the natural numbers, Baire space, and Cantor space.

Meaning of the notation

The following meanings can be attached to the notation for the arithmetical hierarchy on formulas.

The subscript  in the symbols  and  indicates the number of alternations of blocks of universal and existential number quantifiers that are used in a formula.   Moreover, the outermost block is existential in  formulas and universal in  formulas.

Type 0 objects are natural numbers, and objects of type  are functions that map the set of objects of  type  to the natural numbers. Quantification over higher type objects, such as functions from natural numbers to natural numbers, is described by a superscript greater than 0, as in the analytical hierarchy. The superscript 0 indicates quantifiers over numbers, the superscript 1 would indicate quantification over functions from numbers to numbers (type 1 objects), the superscript 2 would correspond to quantification over functions that take a type 1 object and return a number, and so on.

Examples 

 The  sets of numbers are those definable by a formula of the form  where  has only bounded quantifiers.  These are exactly the recursively enumerable sets.
Intuitively, an index  falls into this set if and only if for every  "there is an  such that the Turing machine with index  halts on input  after  steps”. A complete proof would show that the property displayed in quotes in the previous sentence is definable in the language of Peano arithmetic by a  formula.
 Every  subset of Baire space or Cantor space is an open set in the usual topology on the space.  Moreover, for any such set there is a computable enumeration of Gödel numbers of basic open sets whose union is the original set. For this reason,  sets are sometimes called effectively open.  Similarly, every  set is closed and the  sets are sometimes called effectively closed.
 Every arithmetical subset of Cantor space or Baire space is a Borel set. The lightface Borel hierarchy extends the arithmetical hierarchy to include additional Borel sets. For example, every  subset of Cantor or Baire space is a  set (that is, a set which equals the intersection of countably many open sets). If  is a  formula with a free set variable X and free number variables  then the  set  is the intersection of the  sets of the form  as n ranges over the set of natural numbers.
 The  formulas can be checked by going over all cases one by one, which is possible because all their quantifiers are bounded. The time for this is polynomial in their arguments (e.g. polynomial in n for ); thus their corresponding decision problems are included in E (as n is exponential in its number of bits).
 The  formulas under an alternative definition, that allows the use of primitive recursive functions with bounded quantifiers, correspond to sets of natural numbers of the form  for a primitive recursive function f.

Properties 

The following properties hold for the arithmetical hierarchy of sets of natural numbers and the arithmetical hierarchy of subsets of Cantor or Baire space.

 The inclusions  and  hold for all . Thus the hierarchy does not collapse. This is a direct consequence of Post's theorem.
. The inclusion is strict by the definition given in this article, but an identity with  holds under one of the variations of the definition given above.

Relation to Turing machines

Computable sets
If S is a Turing computable set, then both S and its complement are recursively enumerable (if T is a Turing machine giving 1 for inputs in S and 0 otherwise, we may build a Turing machine halting only on the former, and another halting only on the latter).

For every number n, exactly one of these halts. We may therefore construct a Turing machine T that alternates between T1 and T2, halting and returning 1 when the former halts or halting and returning 0 when the latter halts. Thus T halts on every n and returns whether it is in S, So S is computable.

Summary of main results
The Turing computable sets of natural numbers are exactly the sets at level  of the arithmetical hierarchy.  The recursively enumerable sets are exactly the sets at level .

No oracle machine  is capable of solving its own halting problem (a variation of Turing's proof applies).

Post's theorem establishes a close connection between the arithmetical hierarchy of sets of natural numbers and the Turing degrees.  In particular, it establishes the following facts  for all n ≥ 1:

The polynomial hierarchy is a "feasible resource-bounded" version of the arithmetical hierarchy in which polynomial length bounds are placed on the numbers involved (or, equivalently, polynomial time bounds are placed on the Turing machines involved).  It gives a finer classification of some sets of natural numbers that are at level  of the arithmetical hierarchy.

Relation to other hierarchies

See also 
 Analytical hierarchy
 Lévy hierarchy
 Hierarchy (mathematics)
 Interpretability logic
 Polynomial hierarchy

References 

 .
 .
 .
 .

Mathematical logic hierarchies
Computability theory
Effective descriptive set theory
Hierarchy
Complexity classes